Wildlife Act may refer to:

Wildlife Act 1953 in New Zealand
Wildlife Act 1976, Ireland
Wildlife Act 2000, Ireland
Wildlife and Countryside Act 1981, of the United Kingdom
Canada Wildlife Act
Wildlife Protection Act of 1972, India
Fish and Wildlife Act, United States
National Parks and Wildlife Act 1974 (NSW), Australia
Wildlife Conservation Act 1950, Western Australia
National Parks and Wildlife Act 1972, South Australia